Cytharopsis cancellata is a species of sea snail, a marine gastropod mollusk in the family Mangeliidae.

Description
The length of the shell varies between 20 mm and 30 mm.

The shell is acuminated above and below. It is reddish brown. The spire and the aperture are equal in length. The whorls are convex; longitudinally costellate, transversely lirate, closely elegantly cancellate. The body whorl is produced and acuminated below.

Distribution
This marine species occurs off Japan, and the Philippines; in the East China Sea.

References

 A. Adams, On some new Genera of Mollusca from the Seas of Japan; Annals and Magazine of Natural History, 1865, xv, 322
 Liu J.Y. [Ruiyu] (ed.). (2008). Checklist of marine biota of China seas. China Science Press. 1267 pp.

External links
  Tucker, J.K. 2004 Catalog of recent and fossil turrids (Mollusca: Gastropoda). Zootaxa 682: 1–1295.
 

cancellata
Gastropods described in 1865